Mardansina (also spelled Mardan Sina) was a Parthian nobleman from the House of Mihran—he was the son of Bahram Gushnasp and thus the brother of the prominent Sasanian military leader Bahram Chobin,  who managed to overthrow the Sasanian king himself briefly in 590–591, but was eventually defeated and killed. Mardansina thereafter became the new leader of the rebel movement of Bahram Chobin, and later took part in the rebellion of Vistahm (591–596 or 594/5–600).

Sources

External links 
 https://www.academia.edu/12102614/AN_HISTORIOGRAPHICAL_STUDY_of_AB%C5%AA_%E1%B8%A4AN%C4%AAFA_A%E1%B8%A4MAD_IBN_D%C4%80W%C5%AAD_IBN_WANAND_AL-D%C4%AANAWAR%C4%AA_S_Kit%C4%81b_al-A%E1%B8%ABb%C4%81r_al-%E1%B9%ACiw%C4%81l

Year of death unknown
6th-century births
6th-century Iranian people
House of Mihran
People from Ray, Iran
Rebellions against the Sasanian Empire